Plesiotrygon, the antenna rays, is a small genus of freshwater stingrays in the family Potamotrygonidae endemic to the Amazon basin in South America. They are found in large rivers and the lower part of their tributaries.

Plesiotrygon are occasionally kept in aquariums and both species have been bred in captivity, but they are sensitive and the tail is easily damaged.

Species
There are two recognized species:

 Plesiotrygon iwamae R. de S. Rosa, Castello & Thorson, 1987 (Long-tailed river stingray, antenna ray)
 Plesiotrygon nana M. R. de Carvalho & Ragno, 2011 (Black-tailed antenna ray, dwarf antenna ray)

References 

Potamotrygonidae
Ray genera
Freshwater fish genera